Roman Burets (born 28 January 1997) is a Belarusian professional footballer who plays for Rogachev.

References

External links 
 
 

1997 births
Living people
Belarusian footballers
Association football forwards
FC Energetik-BGU Minsk players
FC Smolevichi players
FC Granit Mikashevichi players
FC Uzda players
FC Dnepr Rogachev players